Ole Gunnar Fidjestøl (born 21 March 1960) is a Norwegian former ski jumper.

Career
He won silver medals in the team large hill event at the Nordic World Ski Championships (1987, 1989) as well as a bronze medal in the team large hill at the 1988 Winter Olympics.

Fidjestøl won the 1988 Ski Flying World Championships in Oberstdorf and earned four additional career victories from 1985 to 1989. He won also four individual titles and one team title at the national level.

Since retiring from competition, he has been involved administratively with Vikersund IF and the football club Modum FK.

World Cup

Standings

Wins

References
 

1960 births
Living people
Sportspeople from Kristiansand
Norwegian male ski jumpers
Olympic ski jumpers of Norway
Olympic bronze medalists for Norway
People from Buskerud
People from Modum
Ski jumpers at the 1984 Winter Olympics
Ski jumpers at the 1988 Winter Olympics
Olympic medalists in ski jumping
FIS Nordic World Ski Championships medalists in ski jumping
Medalists at the 1988 Winter Olympics
20th-century Norwegian people